SPDR funds (pronounced "spider") are a family of exchange-traded funds (ETFs) traded in the United States, Europe, Mexico and Asia-Pacific and managed by State Street Global Advisors (SSGA). Informally, they are also known as Spyders or Spiders. SPDR is a trademark of Standard and Poor's Financial Services LLC, a subsidiary of S&P Global. The name is an acronym for the first member of the family, the Standard & Poor's Depositary Receipts, now the SPDR S&P 500 Trust ETF, which is designed to track the S&P 500 stock market index.

For a long time, the SPDR S&P 500 was the largest ETF in the world. SSGA also manage the SPDR Gold Shares, which for a while was the second-largest ETF in the world. As of August 2012, they were the first and second largest exchange-traded products in the world.

The funds are formulated as unit investment trusts. In 2007, SSGA rebranded its other United States ETFs as SPDRs, including the StreetTRACKS family and its other flagship ETF shares, the DOW DIAMONDS, that tracks the Dow Jones Industrial Average. This move united all U.S. ETFs managed by SSGA, a total of 23 at that time, under a single brand.  
At the end of 2006, the total portfolio that became known as SPDRs had $102 billion of assets under management.

As of Dec 2019, SPDR is the third largest ETF provider, behind iShares and Vanguard, with assets of $714 bn.

Other funds

In 1995, Mid-Cap SPDRs were launched by the Bank of New York to track Standard & Poor's S&P 400 index of middle-market equity shares.

The DIAMONDS were developed, like the original SPDR, by SSGA in cooperation with the American Stock Exchange.  DOW DIAMOND shares are designed to track the Dow Jones Industrial Average.

In 1998, SSGA and Merrill Lynch introduced the Sector Spiders, which now consist of ten funds which follow the eleven GICS sectors of the S&P 500.
Because the S&P 500 contains only four telecommunications companies, those companies are a part of the information technology SPDR, and that one fund represents those two sectors.

SSGA also launched a number of index-based ETFs under the brand StreetTRACKS.  These were renamed SPDRs in 2007.

SSGA also manages ETFs that are sold on exchanges outside the United States.

In Australia SSGA manages three SPDR branded ETFs. 
They are listed on the Australian Securities Exchange and are the following: 
S&P/ASX 50 Fund (50 top market cap stocks) 
S&P/ASX 200 Fund (200 top market cap stocks)
S&P/ASX 200 A-REIT Property Fund (200 Listed Property Fund)

Selected funds
Dow Jones Global Real Estate ETF 
Dow Jones Global Titans ETF 
Dow Jones International Real Estate ETF 
Dow Jones REIT ETF 
Dow Jones STOXX 50 ETF 
Dow Jones EURO STOXX 50 ETF 
Dow Diamonds  (SGX:D07) - Tracks Dow Jones Industrial Average
S&P 500 ETF  (SGX:S27) - Tracks S&P 500 Index
S&P Biotech ETF 
S&P BRIC 40 ETF 
S&P China ETF 
S&P Dividend ETF 
S&P Pharmaceuticals ETF 
S&P Retail ETF 
S&P Homebuilders ETF 
S&P Emerging Asia Pacific ETF 
S&P Emerging Markets ETF 
S&P Emerging Markets Small Cap ETF 
S&P MidCap 400 ETF 
S&P International Small Cap ETF 
S&P International Consumer Discretionary Sector ETF 
S&P International Consumer Staples Sector ETF 
S&P International Dividend ETF 
S&P International Energy Sector ETF 
S&P International Financial Sector ETF 
S&P International Health Care Sector ETF 
S&P International Industrial Sector ETF 
S&P International Materials Sector ETF 
S&P International Technology Sector ETF 
S&P International Telecommunications Sector ETF 
S&P International Utilities Sector ETF 
S&P Metals and Mining ETF 
S&P Oil & Gas Equipment & Services ETF 
S&P Oil & Gas Exploration & Production ETF 
S&P Semiconductor ETF 
S&P World ex-US ETF 
Barclays Capital 1-3 Month T-Bill ETF 
Barclays Capital Aggregate Bond ETF 
Barclays Capital Convertible Secs 
Barclays Capital Municipal Bond ETF 
Barclays Capital Short Term Municipal Bond ETF 
Barclays Capital Short Term International Treasury Bond ETF 
Barclays Capital High Yield Bond ETF 
Barclays Capital Intermediate Term Credit Bond ETF 
Barclays Capital Intermediate Term Treasury ETF 
Barclays Capital International Treasury Bond ETF 
Barclays Capital Long Term Credit Bond ETF 
Barclays Capital Mortgage Backed Bond ETF 
BarCap ST High Yield Bond ETF 
Barclays Capital TIPS ETF 
Consumer Discretionary Select Sector SPDR Fund 
Consumer Staples Select Sector SPDR Fund 
DB International Government Inflation-Protected Bond ETF 
Energy Select Sector SPDR Fund 
Financial Select Sector SPDR Fund 
FTSE Greater China ETF (HKEx:3073)
Gold Shares  (HKEx:2840) (SGX:O87)
Health Care Select Sector SPDR Fund 
Industrial Select Sector SPDR Fund 
KBW Bank ETF 
KBW Capital Markets ETF 
KBW Regional Banking ETF 
KBW Insurance ETF 
Materials Select Sector SPDR Fund 
Morgan Stanley Technology ETF 
MSCI ACWI ex-US ETF 
Russell/Nomura PRIME Japan ETF 
Straits Times Index ETF (SGX:ES3)
Technology Select SPDR Fund 
Utilities Select Sector SPDR Fund

See also
 iShares
 List of exchange-traded funds
 PowerShares
 The Vanguard Group

References

External links
SPDRs
SPDR Gold Trust Volume Charts

Financial services companies established in 1993
Companies listed on the New York Stock Exchange
S&P Global
Exchange-traded funds